Klaus Emmerich (born 10 August 1943) is a German film director and screenwriter. His 1979 film The First Polka was entered into the 29th Berlin International Film Festival. His 1981 film Trokadero was entered into the 12th Moscow International Film Festival.

Selected filmography
 Heiratskandidaten (1975, TV film) — (based on a play by Gabriele Wohmann)
 Erziehung durch Dienstmädchen (1975, TV film) — (based on a novel by Robert Wolfgang Schnell)
 Kreutzer (1977)
  (1978, TV film) — (biographical film about Heinrich Heine)
 The First Polka (1979) — (based on a novel by Horst Bienek)
 Trokadero (1981) — (screenplay by Jörg Graser)
 Rote Erde (1983, TV miniseries) — (screenplay by Peter Stripp)
 Tatort:  (1986, TV series episode)
 Reporter (1989, TV series)
 Rote Erde, second season (1990, TV miniseries) — (screenplay by Peter Stripp)
  (1991) — (screenplay by Bernd Schroeder)

References

External links

1943 births
Living people
Mass media people from Saxony